Shōzō Makino (牧野省三, Makino Shōzō, September 22, 1878, Kyoto – July 25, 1929) was a Japanese film director, film producer and businessman who is regarded as a pioneering director of Japanese film. In addition, all four of his sons, including Masahiro Makino and Sadatsugu Matsuda, went into the film business as either directors or producers, and his grandchildren include the actors Masahiko Tsugawa and Hiroyuki Nagato. Actress Yoko Minamida is a granddaughter-in-law.

Career
Makino was born in Kyoto on September 22, 1878.  His mother ran a theater, and his association with movies began when the motion picture producer Einosuke Yokota of Yokota Shōkai asked for his help in filming period films. Shozo discovered actor Matsunosuke Onoe working in an itinerant kabuki troupe and enlisted him into becoming Japan's first film star. He directed over 60 Matsunosuke films a year in the early 1910s, most if not all short films.

In addition to creating the unique genre of the Japanese period film, Makino also incorporated trick camera techniques and a myriad of other cinematic methods of expression into his films. In 1919, he founded the Mikado Company and began to produce educational films. He later founded an independent production company, Makino Film Productions, and from 1923, continued as a director and as producer. Makino Film Productions turned out many successful movies also made by several other directors and actors.

In 1928, he directed the epic, Jitsuroku Chushingura (True Record of the Forty-Seven Ronin), which coincided with his 50th birthday. He died on July 25, 1929.

Family

He had a total of five children. Two of his sons, Sadatsugu Matsuda (1906–2003) and Masahiro Makino (1908–1993) were also film directors. Another, Mitsuo Makino, was a film producer, and another Shinzō Makino, also worked as a director (his wife was the actress Chikako Miyagi). Masahiro married the actress Yukiko Todoroki and their son, Masayuki Makino, is the head of the Okinawa Actor's School. Shōzō's daughter, Tomoko Makino, married the actor Kunitarō Sawamura, and is the mother to actors Masahiko Tsugawa and Hiroyuki Nagato, both of whom married famous actresses, Yukiji Asaoka and Yōko Minamida respectively. Kunitarō's brother and sister are the actors Daisuke Katō and Sadako Sawamura.

Filmography
 1914 Kōchiyama Sōshun
 1921 Jiraiya the Hero (Gōketsu Jiraiya)
 1928 Jitsuroku Chushingura (True Record of the Forty-seven Ronin)

References

External links

 

Japanese film directors
Samurai film directors
Japanese film producers
Japanese cinematographers
Japanese businesspeople
People from Kyoto
1878 births
1929 deaths
20th-century Japanese screenwriters